The National Revival Movement Party is a political party in Azerbaijan led by Faraj Guliyev.

History
In the 2010 parliamentary elections the party won one of the 125 seats in the National Assembly. The party nominated Guliyev as its candidate in the 2013 presidential elections, but he received just 0.86% of the vote. It retained its seat in the 2015 parliamentary elections, and Guliyev ran for the presidency again in the 2018 elections, in which he received 1.16% of the vote. The party lost its parliamentary representation in the 2020 elections.

References

2003 establishments in Azerbaijan
Political parties established in 2011
Political parties in Azerbaijan
2011 establishments in Azerbaijan
Conservative parties in Azerbaijan
National conservative parties
Nationalist parties in Azerbaijan
Azerbaijani democracy movements